Harry Graydon Hadden (August 30, 1874 – October 13, 1945) was an American football player and coach.  Hadden was born in 1874 and raised in the Englewood section of Chicago.  He graduated from the University of Michigan Law Department with an LLB degree in 1895.  While attending law school, Hadden played tackle for the 1894 Michigan Wolverines football team.  Following a tour with the Chicago Athletic Club, he transferred to Notre Dame, where he not only coached the football team in 1895, but also inserted himself into the lineup during a loss to Indianapolis Artillery.  He served as the head coach at the University of Notre Dame in 1895, tallying a mark of 3–1.  He returned to Michigan as an assistant coach in 1899.  In 1902, he was employed by the Knickerbocker Ice Company in Chicago.  As of 1912, he was employed as a sales agent in Kenilworth, Illinois.  At the time of his registration for the draft in 1918, Hadden was living and working in Washington, D.C., as Assistant Supervisor of the U.S. Shipping Board, Emergency Fleet Corp. He suffered burns on his face and hands in a fire at a two-story building in Washington, D.C., in November 1918.  As of 1941, he was retired and living in New York City.

Head coaching record

References

1874 births
1945 deaths
19th-century players of American football
American football tackles
Michigan Wolverines football coaches
Michigan Wolverines football players
Notre Dame Fighting Irish football coaches
Notre Dame Fighting Irish football players
Sportspeople from Chicago
Players of American football from Chicago
University of Michigan Law School alumni